Luisa Cristina del Rosario Maida Leiva (born October 7, 1979 in San Salvador) is a Salvadoran sport shooter. She won two medals, silver and bronze, for the 10 and 25 m pistol events at the 2007 Pan American Games in Rio de Janeiro, Brazil.

Maida made her official debut for the 2000 Summer Olympics in Sydney, where she placed thirty-sixth in the 10 m air pistol, and forty-first in the 25 m pistol, with total scores of 368 and 557 points, respectively.

Eight years after competing in her last Olympics, Maida qualified for her second Salvadoran team, as a 29-year-old, at the 2008 Summer Olympics in Beijing, where she competed in two pistol shooting events. She placed thirty-fourth out of forty-four shooters in the women's 10 m air pistol by two points ahead of Czech Republic's Michaela Musilová, with a total score of 375 targets. Three days later, Maida reached the final of the women's 25 m pistol, as the first female Latin American sport shooter, after scoring a total of 582 targets (292 in the precision stage and 290 in the rapid fire) from the qualifying rounds. Unfortunately, she finished only in eighth place by 3.7 points behind Thailand's Tanyaporn Prucksakorn, with a total score of 774.0 targets (192.0 in the final).

Olympic results

References

External links
NBC 2008 Olympics profile

Salvadoran female sport shooters
Living people
Olympic shooters of El Salvador
Shooters at the 2000 Summer Olympics
Shooters at the 2008 Summer Olympics
Shooters at the 2003 Pan American Games
Shooters at the 2007 Pan American Games
Pan American Games silver medalists for El Salvador
Pan American Games bronze medalists for El Salvador
Sportspeople from San Salvador
1979 births
Pan American Games medalists in shooting
Medalists at the 2007 Pan American Games
21st-century Salvadoran women